Mix Nine (Hangul: 믹스나인, stylized as MIXNINE) was a South Korean survival reality show broadcast on JTBC. In the show, YG Entertainment founder and producer Yang Hyun-suk traveled to music agencies across Korea to find up-and-coming K-pop stars. Throughout the episodes, contestants were progressively eliminated, culminating in a competition between a team of the final nine boys and one of the final nine girls. The winning team was to debut as idols, but their debut was ultimately cancelled following contract disputes between YG Entertainment and the contestants' respective agencies.

The season finale was broadcast live on January 26, 2018 at 11pm.

Concept 
Mix Nine was a collaboration project between director Han Dong-chul, producer Yang Hyun-suk, and JTBC. Han Dong-chul, who was the executive producer of the first two seasons of Mnet's Produce 101 originally came with the concept for the show's third season. The show had 400 auditions from more than 70 agencies which Yang and the guest judges personally visited. Contestants included both trainees and lesser known K-pop idols looking to seek further attention. According to Yang, good looks and have pleasing personalities are some of his preference in choosing the trainees, although not a requirement. 170 trainees were chosen by Yang Hyun-suk and guest judges CL, Zion.T, Seungri, and Taeyang.

After the agency tour concluded, the trainees were divided into four classes (Debut team, A, B, and C) to train and compete in ranking missions that were judged by a combination of judge evaluations and viewer voting.

For the participants' training, several artists were recruited for the show. Vocal trainer and singer Ha Dong-kyun and singer Suran were in charge of the vocal training. In addition, rapper Swings was their rap mentor, while YG Entertainment dancers Kwon Young-deuk and Kwon Young-don were responsible for training. With nine members each, the remaining male team would go against the remaining female team. The final group would promote for seven months.

Pre-show and promotions 
On September 18, a 2-minute video teaser was uploaded via YG Entertainment's YouTube in which Yang briefly described the show concept. Through his Instagram account, Yang also constantly updated which companies he already visited and how many trainees had passed so far. At the same time, the show also released photos of trainees who had undergone the audition, which included members from KNK, 24K, ONF, Loona, and JJCC.

On September 14, JTBC announced an upcoming press conference on the 19th. On that day, the show's producers Han Dong-chul and Yoo Sung Mo attended a press conference held at the JTBC building, and the confirmation of the show's premiere was announced to be on October 29. On September 25, Noh Hong-cheol was announced to be the host of the show. About a month after, JTBC released a representative image of the show on October 11 with the caption 'Save a Shining Boy and Girl' and the logo 9. On the same day, another video teaser, in which singer Zion.T was announced as one of the judges of the show, was released.

The day before the premiere of the show, the show's production presentation was held at a hotel near Hakdong Station. Yang Hyun-suk and Han Dong-cheol, together with Seungri and Zion.T attended the presentation. On the same day, the participants singing and dancing to its theme song was released. On November 19 two different versions of the song and music videos were released. Three different versions of the song were released overall: Boys' version led by Hyojin of ONF, girls' version led by Lee Sujin from Fave Entertainment (now in Weeekly) and a co-ed version performed by both teams. Produced by Teddy, "Just Dance" was reported to be his first song produced for a non-YG Entertainment artist.

Contestants

Male contestants 
Color key

Female contestants 
Color key

Elimination chart 
The first elimination round starts at Episode 7; second round at Episode 10; third round at Episode 13; and the final elimination round at Episode 14, wherein the Debut Team was announced.

Color key

Male participants

Female participants

Episodes 
The first half of the show is labelled 'Enter Tour Step' while the second half is 'Competition Step'.

Episode 1 (October 29, 2017) 
The first episode introduces all 170 participants, some of whom described their intentions in joining the program. Noh Hong-chul was seen as the show's host. The next part introduces Yang Hyun-suk and rapper CL as the judges as they start travelling to different agencies located all over the country for the audition through Yang's car. Two buses ('Debut Bus' for the nine chosen contestants and 'Trainee Bus' for the remaining ones) are seen travelling along with the judges car. For every contestant who passes the audition, he or she would be riding the bus along with the other contestants. The trainees' auditions are simultaneously watched by the judges, their agency's CEO, and their co-trainees in the bus. At the end of the episode, the music video of "Just Dance" was shown.

Episode 2 (November 5, 2017) 
The show starts with introducing a '1-Day Special Mission' for the chosen participants of the show, to be shown later on. For now, the episode continues with Yang Hyun-suk travelling to different places for auditions In this episode, singer Zion.T comes along with him to judge. Towards the end of the episode, BigBang member Seungri joins Yang in his car going to one of the biggest agencies in South Korea, JYP Entertainment.

Episode 3 (November 12, 2017) 
Again, the show starts with the participants gathering in a room to do the '1-Day Special Mission'; a new set of "Debut Team" will be formed after their evaluation. Participants are given two (girls) or three (boys) dance songs for them to perform in front of judges Yang Hyun-suk and Lee Seungri. Participants who are given the pass by the judges would proceed to the singing portion and only nine people would be chosen to be included in the "Debut Team". The trainees are given a shortlist of songs. After the 20-minute video, auditions carry on with Yang Hyun-suk by himself for the first half of this episode. Then, the episode continues with finishing JYP Entertainment's audition's scene (which was held during the end of the second episode) and Park Jin-young judging YG Entertainment's trainees afterwards. The episode also features BigBang's Taeyang as a guest judge. With this, this episode concludes the auditions for the show: the judges panel toured for 15 days (240 hours); 72 entertainment agencies have visited; 403 participants auditioned; 170 participants (98 girls and 72 boys) passed the audition. It also marks the start of public voting.

Episode 4 (November 19, 2017) 
The episode starts off with giving each participant his/her number according to their rankings. All contestants are divided into four levels: Top 9, A, B, and C. At that moment, the 'Mix Nine's VLive Showcase' is announced along with the show's theme song, "Just Dance", and its choreography. The participants start to train by their levels with the trainers of the show. Right after, their mentors tell them their new mission: record their song and dance individually from 9AM to 3PM for re-evaluation of their level, or they are automatically put to C-class. The next day, all participants are to perform once again for a chance to level up (or down). Nine chosen members from each level of girls' and boys' team perform the song on stage. A new set of Debut Team are formed at the end: ONF's Hyojin and Fave's Lee Sujin are chosen by Yang as the male and female centers, respectively, for their first live performance. In the performance, Blackpink's member Jennie joined as guest judge. By the end of the show, their rankings based on the judges and people's votes are revealed. In total votes, the boys team (28,650 votes) earned an additional 1000 points each for winning against the girls (25,680 votes).

Episode 5 (November 26, 2017) 
Noh Hong-chul meets with the trainees to announce the next challenge after the ranking announcement. The trainees are tasked to perform live in groups based on positions they want to debut in: vocal, dance or rap. Participants of each gender will have to choose from four rap songs, six vocal songs, or eight dance songs: 18 songs in total. If the number of people exceeded in their chosen song, the team will decide whom to drop through self-evaluation. The male and female participants will go against each other based on their position and the group who earns the highest points combined (50% judges; 50% audience's votes) will receive an additional 2,000 points each. Only six groups are covered this week.

Episode 6 (December 3, 2017) 
The remaining twelve teams perform their respective stages and rehearsals for the groups are shown. After the last performance, the contestants are shown their overall ranking based on their positions. The additional 2,000 points are given to nine teams (88 contestants) for receiving the combined highest points on their respective group and additional 2,000 points to Kim Byeong-kwan, Woo Jin-young, Kim Hyo-jin for males and Kim Hyun-jin, Jeong Sa-ra, Im So-hyun for females for receiving the highest points in dance, rap, and vocal position respectively.

Episode 7 (December 10, 2017) 
The first elimination round takes place on this episode. Participants enter the stage by their Position Battle teams and snippets of their performance are shown. Yang announces whether each member passes or gets eliminated in the show based on the showcase, position battles, additional points and online votes. Out of 170 participants, 99 remain (46 girls; 52 boys) and 71 contestants are eliminated. The Top 9 from each gender were then announced: Woo Jin-young and Shin Ryu-jin receive 1st place, while the former ranks first in the overall rank; Lee Jaejun ranks 99th, escaping elimination.

Episode 8 (December 17, 2017) 
A new mission is announced: Formation Battle. Unlike the first mission, Formation Battle is a battle between the same gender. Also, the songs, remastered by YG producers, are decided through the survey about the contestants' role models and life-song. 10 teams are formed to compete for 10 songs given. Being in the Debut team, the members are allowed to choose their preferred songs. However, a maximum of three members from the Debut team are allowed in one song. They are to choose their members afterwards. The winning team will receive an additional of 10,000 votes while 2nd to 4th placers will receive 7000, 5000, 3000 more votes, respectively. 5th place receives 0 votes. The performances of all the female teams (5 groups) are covered this week: "Tell Me Your Wish" (Girls' Generation), "I'm Your Girl" (S.E.S.), "Bad Girl Good Girl" (Miss A), "Really Really" (Winner), and "Honey" (KARA).

Episode 9 (December 24, 2017) 
The episode starts off with revealing the ranks of the girls' performances. It then continues with the formation battle between the remaining 52 male contestants. The performances of all the male teams (5 groups) are as follows: "Hug" (TVXQ), "Ringa Linga" (Taeyang), "It's You" (Super Junior), "Paradise Lost" (Gain), and "Bang Bang Bang" (BigBang).

Episode 10 (December 31, 2017) 
The episode starts off with revealing the ranks of the boys' performances. Then, another new mission is announced: Digital Song Battle. Both male and female teams will be given three songs - Kang Wook-jin, Diggy, and LIØN's "Hand in Hand"; FUTURE BOUNCE's "Super Freak"; MC Mong's "Stand By Me"; and "After This Night"; Ilhoon and Kamen Rider's "Hush"; and Kim Dohoon's "Dangerous Girl". Participants are judged individually and only ranks 1 to 27 from the male and female teams are able to participate however, prior to the elimination, all participants pick their chosen songs. Soon after, the second elimination round commenced. Yang announces whether each member passes or gets eliminated in the show, and then announces each Top 9. Woo Jin-young and Shin Ryu-jin rank 1st place once again; the latter ranks first in the overall rank.

Episode 11 (January 7, 2018) 
Participants who survived are re-grouped (a maximum of nine members each) due to uneven distribution after the last elimination round. Male and female members from each team go against each other and the three best individuals for each team will receive 5000, 7000, and 10000 points, respectively. Individual scores are based on 20% judge votes and 80% audience votes. All three female groups are covered this week.

Episode 12 (January 14, 2018) 
The episode follows the Digital Song Battle with the remaining three male groups' performances. By the end of the episode, a preview of the Debut Team going to BigBang's concert as a present by Yang Hyun-suk was shown.

Episode 13 (January 21, 2018) 
The episode starts with a poll of the participants conducted before the elimination round. This includes 'Top 3 Visual': Kim Hyojin, Kim Hyun-jong, and Lee Jae-jun for boys, Lee Ha-young, Choi Moon-hee, and Jeon Hee-jin for girls; 'Hot Guy Representative' Shim Jae-young; 'Crying Queen' Shin Ji-won; 'Most Energetic Girl' Kim Su-hyun and Kim Hyun-jin; and 'Most Easily Excited Boy' Kim Guk-heon. During the elimination round; participants enter the stage by their Digital Song Battle teams. Jang Seongkyu replaced Noh as the host for today. Names of the top 18 trainees are called by Yang one by one starting from rank 15. Shin Ryu-jin retains her 1st rank while Kim Hyo-jin replaces Woo Jin-young for the first time. Four new songs are announced afterwards: "Come Over" (produced by Robin) and "Omona" for girls; "I Like It Too" (produced by Kang Wookjin, LIØN, and Diggy) and "What!?" (produced by Kang Wookjin, iHAWK, BIGTONE, and Diggy) for boys. The remaining trainees choose their positions beginning with rank 18 up to 1, with the higher ranked trainees being given the advantage of replacing the lower ranked trainees and bumping them into another song. After finalizing the teams of four groups at the end of the episode, 12 participant representatives' audition presentations or live performances are shown according to their positions: dance, rap, vocal.

Episode 14 (January 26, 2018) 
This episode was broadcast live at the Ilsan Kintex, five days after the last episode. Both Noh Hong-chul and Jang Sungkyu host the show while the final judges include Seungri, Taeyang, Zion.T and Yang Hyun-suk.

All the participants are first introduced one-by-one according to their ranks starting from the men's team. Soon after, they perform "Come Over", "What!?", "Omona", and "I Like It Too", respectively. After their performances, a VTR of the participants watching their individual "Just Dance" re-evaluation (from Episode 4) was shown. They then performed "Just Dance" live with Kim Hyo-jin and Shin Ryu-jin as the centers. Following the performance, the live voting closed and the announcement of Top 9 started. Both Woo Jin-young and Shin Ryu-jin topped the men's and women's team. In the end, men's team won against women's with the score of 8,114 over 7,866. The scores are determined 20% pre-broadcast online votes, 30% text votes during the live show, 20% pre-broadcast online preference rankings, and 30% judges' scores.

Performances 

The following table shows the performances and winners during the three battles (Position Battle; Formation Battle; Digital Song Battle) during the show. The four songs performed live on Episode 14 are not listed.

Discography 
All singles were released by YG Entertainment and LOEN Entertainment.

Part 1

Part 2

Part 3

Part 4

Part 5

Part 6

Ratings 
In the table below,  represent the lowest ratings and  represent the highest ratings.

Aftermath 
On May 3, 2018, YG Entertainment revealed that the debut for the male winning group had been cancelled.

On June 26, 2018, Happyface Entertainment, whose male trainee Woo Jin Young was set to debut as their center, filed a lawsuit against YG for 10 million Korean won (over 8,800 USD). “More than to be compensated for all the damages we have received, this is a symbolic amount filed in our hopes that Korean popular culture, the home of hallyu, will progress healthily without the overuse of power by large companies," stated a source from Happyface.

On November 26, 2018, representatives from each company presented their arguments at the Seoul Central District Court. The court made the decision to proceed, and the next day of argument was set for January 16, 2019.

Notes

References

External links
  
 Mix Nine at JTBC Worldwide

Korean-language television shows
2017 South Korean television series debuts
2018 South Korean television series endings
K-pop television series
South Korean reality television series
South Korean variety television shows
Music competitions in South Korea
JTBC original programming
Television series by YG Entertainment